The 2007 edition of the Vattenfall Cyclassics cycle race took place in the German city of Hamburg on August 19, 2007. Alessandro Ballan won the race, beating last years winner Óscar Freire.

General Standings

2007-19-08: Hamburg-Hamburg, 229,1 km

Olaf Pollack received no UCI ProTour points because his team, Wiesenhof–Felt, is not part of the UCI ProTour.

References

External links
Race website

2007
2007 UCI ProTour
2007 in German sport